Macedonia competed at the 2018 Winter Olympics in Pyeongchang, South Korea, from 9 to 25 February 2018, with three competitors in two sports.

Competitors
The following is the list of number of competitors participating in the delegation per sport.

Alpine skiing 

Macedonia qualified one male alpine skier.

Cross-country skiing 

Macedonia qualified two athletes, one male and one female.

Distance

Sprint

See also
Macedonia at the 2018 Summer Youth Olympics

References

Nations at the 2018 Winter Olympics
2018
2018 in Republic of Macedonia sport